Emoh Ruo is a 1985 Australian comedy film directed by Denny Lawrence and starring Joy Smithers and Martin Sacks.

Plot
The Tunkleys move from a caravan park into a suburban home goes wrong.

Reception
Andrew Urban wrote that "Emoh Ruo relies on stereotypes, but it does so with larrikin good humour, and lets us enjoy a big, lowbrow finish." The Sydney Morning Herald stated "Emoh Ruo is a pleasant entertainment, but less than memorable". Writing in Cinema Papers Christine Cremen says "With its lively combination of satire, sentimentality, near-tragedy and pratfall farce, Emoh Ruo resembles one of the better Preston Sturges comedies". Writing in the book Australian Film, 1978-1994: A Survey of Theatrical Features Bruce Sandow states "More light-hearted situation comedy than biting satire, the film has its amusing moments. Competently made and entertaining in a lowbrow way, it has no pretensions to social comment. But its resorting to well-known Australian stereotypes is more often witless than inspired." A review in Variety finishes "Overall, Emoh Ruo might just be the success the Australian film industry is looking for right now".

Awards
Emoh Ruo was nominated for an AFI Awards for Best Actress in a Supporting Role for Genevieve Mooy.

Cast
Joy Smithers - Terri Tunkley
Martin Sacks - Des Tunkley
Jack Ellis - Jack Tunkley
Philip Quast - Les Tunkley
Louise Le Nay - Helen Tunkley
Joanna Burgess - Tunkley Twin
Nathalie Burgess - Tunkley Twin
Genevieve Mooy - Margaret York
Max Phipps - Sam Tregado
Bill Young - Wally Wombat
Helen McDonald - Pat Harrison
Mervyn Drake - Warren Harrison
Noel Hodda - Pete
Richard Carter - Thommo
Di Smith - Cheryl Mason
Lance Curtis - Wayne Mason
Garry Who - Policeman
Charito Ortez - Sam's Receptionist
Rainee Skinner - Teller 
John Spicer - Magistrate 
Ray Marshall - Clarrie 
Tracey Higginson - Surfer Girl 
Angelo D'Angelo - Surfer Guy 
Suzanne Dudley - Supervisor
Zafar Khan - Indian Couple 
Azra Khan - Indian Couple 
Ian McGowan - Des' Bus Driving Double 
Archie - George Harrison

See also
 Cinema of Australia

References

External links

1985 films
1985 comedy films
Australian comedy films
1985 drama films
1980s English-language films
1980s Australian films